TransMiCable is a gondola lift system implemented by the city of Bogotá, Colombia, with the purpose of providing a complementary transportation service to TransMilenio. Line T, with a length of 3,34 km and four stations, connects the Portal del Tunal (TransMilenio) station to Mirador del Paraíso station in the steep hills of Ciudad Bolívar district and was opened on 27 December 2018. It is part of the city's Integrated Public Transport System, along with TransMilenio and the urban, complementary and special bus services operating on neighbourhoods and main streets. 

The system was built in 26 months and is designed to transport 7,000 people per hour.

Infrastructure 
TransMiCable consists of one gondola lift line (Line T) with a length of 3.34 km located in Ciudad Bolívar district in the south of the city.

See also 

 TransMilenio
 Metrocable (Medellín)

References

External links 
 Official website (in Spanish)

Aerial tramways in Colombia
Vertical transport devices
Bogotá
Transport infrastructure completed in 2018
2018 establishments in Colombia